Bear Canyon, located in the Sabino Canyon recreation area of the Coronado National Forest near Tucson, Arizona, offers views of the Santa Catalina Mountains to the north.  Accessible by tram or foot from the Sabino Canyon visitors' center, Bear Canyon contains such attractions as the seasonal Seven Falls and Thimble Peak.

Sources and external links
Sabino Canyon Recreation Area
Map of Bear Canyon

Santa Catalina Mountains
Canyons and gorges of Arizona
Geography of Tucson, Arizona
Landforms of Pima County, Arizona